The following highways are numbered 944:

United States